An otoscope or auriscope is a medical device which is used to look into the ears. Health care providers use otoscopes to screen for illness during regular check-ups and also to investigate ear symptoms.  An otoscope potentially gives a view of the ear canal and tympanic membrane or eardrum.  Because the eardrum is the border separating the external ear canal from the middle ear, its characteristics can be indicative of various diseases of the middle ear space.  The presence of earwax (cerumen), shed skin, pus, canal skin edema, foreign body, and various ear diseases can obscure any view of the eardrum and thus severely compromise the value of otoscopy done with a common otoscope, but confirm the presence of obstructing symptoms.  
  
The most commonly used otoscopes consist of a handle and a head. The head contains a light source and a simple low-power magnifying lens, typically around 8 diopters (3.00x Mag). The distal (front) end of the otoscope has an attachment for disposable plastic ear specula. The examiner first straightens the ear canal by pulling on the pinna (usually the earlobe, side or top) and then inserts the ear speculum side of the otoscope into the external ear.  It is important to brace the hand holding the otoscope against the patient's head to avoid injury to the ear canal by placing the index finger or little finger against the head. The examiner can then look through a lens on the rear of the instrument and see inside the ear canal. In many models, the lens can be removed, which allows the examiner to insert instruments through the otoscope into the ear canal, such as for removing earwax. Most models also have an insertion point for a bulb capable of pushing air through the speculum which is called pneumatic otoscope. This puff of air allows an examiner to test the mobility of the tympanic membrane.

Many otoscopes used in doctors offices are wall-mounted while others are portable. Wall-mounted otoscopes are attached by a flexible power cord to a base, which serves to hold the otoscope when it's not in use and also serves as a source of electric power, being plugged into an electric outlet. Portable models are powered by batteries in the handle; these batteries are usually rechargeable and can be recharged from a base unit. Otoscopes are often sold with ophthalmoscopes as a diagnostic set.

Diseases which may be diagnosed by an otoscope include otitis media and otitis externa, infection of the middle and outer parts of the ear, respectively.

Otoscopes are also frequently used for examining patients' noses (avoiding the need for a separate nasal speculum) and (with the speculum removed) upper throats.

The most commonly used otoscopes—those used in emergency rooms, pediatric offices, general practice, and by internists- are monocular devices.  They provide only a two-dimensional view of the ear canal, its contents, and usually at least a portion of the eardrum, depending on what is within the ear canal and its status.  Another method of performing otoscopy (visualization of the ear) is use of a binocular microscope, in conjunction with a larger plastic or metal ear speculum, with the patient supine and the head tilted, which provides a much larger field of view and the added advantages of a stable head, far superior lighting, and most importantly, depth perception.  A binocular (two-eyed) view is required in order to judge depth.  If wax or another material obstructs the canal and/or a view of the entire eardrum, it can easily and confidently be removed with specialized suction tips and other microscopic ear instruments, whereas the absence of depth perception with the one-eyed view of a common otoscope makes removal of anything more laborious and hazardous.  Another major advantage of the binocular microscope is that both of the examiner's hands are free, since the microscope is suspended from a stand. The microscope has up to 40x power magnification, which allows much more detailed viewing of the entire ear canal, and of the entire eardrum unless edema of the canal skin prevents it.  Subtle changes in the anatomy are much more easily detected and interpreted than with a monocular view otoscope.  Traditionally only ENT specialists (otolaryngologists) and otologists (subspecialty ear doctors) acquire binocular microscopes and the necessary skills and training to use them, and incorporate their routine use in evaluating patient's ear complaints.  Studies have shown that reliance on a monocular otoscope to diagnose ear disease results in a more than 50% chance of misdiagnosis, as compared to binocular microscopic otoscopy.  The expense of acquiring a binocular microscope is only one obstacle to its being more widely adapted to general medicine.  The low level of familiarity with binocular otoscopy among pediatric and general medicine professors in physician training programs is probably a more difficult obstacle to overcome.  Thus, the standard of general otologic diagnosis and ear care remains, for the most part, the largely antiquated monocular otoscope.

Selected patents 
 , "Speculum ", Willard E Dow, 1901.
 , "Otoscope ", Henry L De Zeng, 1926.
 , "Otoscope ", Henry L De Zeng, 1927.
 , "Otoscope ", John G Smith, 1928.
 , "Otoscope ", Arthur F Dittmer, 1939.
 , "Otoscope construction ", William C. Moore, John D. Connors, Richard W. Newman, 1977.
 , "Combination otoscope and audiometer  ", James W. Heller, 1986.

See also
 Intraoral camera

References

External links 

 Phisick – Pictures and information about antique otoscopes

Ear procedures
Medical equipment